.Chester K. Gillespie (1897 - 1985) was a lawyer and politician who worked for civil rights in Cleveland, Ohio. He was born in Home City, Ohio to Warren and Lulu Trail Gillespie. He graduated from Ohio State University and then from Baldwin-Wallace College Law School in 1920. He served three terms in the Ohio General Assembly in 1933-34, 1939–40, and 1943–44. He was a Republican.

He served in the U.S. Army during World War II. He and fellow attorney Clayborne George were denied office space in buildings in downtown Cleveland because they were African American.

Gillespie served as president of the Cleveland Branch of the National Association for the Advancement of Colored People (NAACP) in 1936 and 1937.

References

1897 births
1985 deaths
African-American lawyers
Republican Party members of the Ohio House of Representatives
Ohio State University alumni
Ohio lawyers
Baldwin Wallace University alumni
20th-century African-American politicians
20th-century American politicians
NAACP activists
United States Army personnel of World War II
20th-century American lawyers
African-American state legislators in Ohio
African-American men in politics
Activists from Cleveland
African-American activists
Politicians from Cleveland
Lawyers from Cleveland